An inter-parliamentary institution (also known as parliamentary assembly) is an organization of more than one national legislatures (parliament, assembly, council and other types).

Most of the inter-parliamentary institutions are part of an intergovernmental organization. Such branches of intergovernmental organizations are typically established in order to provide for representation of citizens, rather than governments who are represented in other bodies within the organization. Most of the inter-parliamentary institutions have an assembly comprising members of the national legislatures (whose members are directly elected in most cases).

Most of the inter-parliamentary institutions do not hold legislative power and have a consulting or informal cooperation-stimulating role. When the intergovernmental organization chooses to operate through a hybrid system of not only intergovernmentalism, but also supranationalism an organization-level legislature is established (or a predecessor inter-parliamentary institution is granted legislative power) in the form of international parliament. Members of international parliaments could be assigned in the same way as members of inter-parliamentary institutions or in cases of more advanced supranationalism they could be directly elected.

List of inter-parliamentary institutions

Since 1949, more than 40 parliamentary assemblies have been brought into being.

Commonwealth Parliamentary Association

See also
 Parliamentary assembly
 List of national legislatures

References and external links

Article by Steve Charnovitz on Transparliamentary Assemblies in Global Governance

Parliamentary assemblies

de:Parlamentarische Versammlung